The Spark-Renault SRT_01E, also known as the SRT01-e (since the 2015–16 season) or the Spark Gen1 (after the introduction of the successive Gen2 chassis), was an electric formula race car designed for the inaugural season of Formula E, in 2014–15. The car was the result of a 10-month collaboration between Spark Racing Technology, McLaren Electronic Systems, Williams Advanced Engineering, Dallara and Renault. The car was used until the end of Formula E's fourth season in 2018, after which it was replaced by the SRT05e.

Development

Development of the car started in September 2012. Lucas di Grassi was appointed as official test driver, demonstrating the prototype, the Formulec EF01 (built in 2010). The Formulec EF01 featured a chassis constructed by Mercedes GP and motors built by Siemens. The car was used for the official promotion video and for demonstrations in host cities.

On 1 November 2012, McLaren Electronic Systems was announced to provide the electric motor, transmission and electronics for Formula E. The Formula E organisation ordered 42 cars from Spark Racing Technology. For this order Spark partnered with well renowned formula car manufacturer Dallara.

Michelin was announced as an exclusive tyre-supplier on 28 March 2013. On 15 May 2013 Renault was announced as technical partner of Spark Racing Technology. Renault's experience in the Renault Z.E. (Zero Emission) and Formula One programmes will be used to put to Formula E's advantage.  On the same day, Formula E unveiled the design of the Spark-Renault SRT_01E.

The battery design was in the hands of Williams Advanced Engineering, part of the Williams Group to which the Formula One team belongs.

At the Frankfurt Motor Show, on 10 September 2013, the Spark-Renault SRT_01E was revealed by FIA president Jean Todt and Formula E Holdings CEO Alejandro Agag.

On 3 July 2014, the first official trial of the cars took place in Donington Park, England. The trial ended around 21 August with each team running all four of their cars completing a combined total of 1222 laps. The fastest time was 1:29.920, recorded by the Abt team – a McLaren MP4-12C recorded a lap time of 1:29.679 during the 2012 British GT season.

Technology

RESS
The Spark-Renault SRT_01E featured a Rechargeable Energy Storage System (RESS). According to Appendix J article 251 3.1.7 of the ISC, the RESS is the complete energy storage device, comprising an energy storage medium (e.g. flywheel, capacitor or battery). The design of the RESS is free but must be homologated by the FIA. Part of the RESS is the traction batteries and the Battery Management System, these are supplied by Williams Advanced Engineering.

Electric motor
The electric motor is built by McLaren Electronic Technologies. The motor weighs 26 kg and produces a maximum of 270 bhp with 140Nm of instant torque. The motor was originally developed for the McLaren P1 road car.

Charging
According to the regulations, the Formula E cars can be charged during practice, qualifying, the race and some other specified moments during a raceweekend. Drayson Racing and its technical partner QualcommHALO are developing a way to wirelessly charge the car. The wireless electric vehicle charging (WEVC) system uses a pad under a parking space to charge the car. The system is tested on the electric Drayson B12/69EV, a modified version of the Lola B08/60.

Tyres
The car was shod with 18-inch tyres. The FIA Formula E championship uses a tyre which is suitable for wet and dry conditions. The exclusive tyre supplier Michelin will only make one compound available, so there will be no hard or soft compounds like in Formula 1. The tyre is expected to last the whole race weekend.

Technical specifications

Design
 Aerodynamics optimized to facilitate overtaking
 High ride height sensitivity and wide range of suspension set up possibilities to tackle the city centre streets
 Cost-effectiveness
 Compliant to FIA safety regulations

Technology
 Use of latest technology
 Compromise between performance and cost-effectiveness wherever possible
 Extensive use of composite materials but limited usage of the most expensive carbon-fibres

Dimensions
 Overall length:  (max)
 Overall width:  (max)
 Overall height:  (max)
 Track width:  (min)
 Ride Height:  (max)
 Overall weight (inc driver):  (min) // Batteries alone

Power
 Max power (limited): , approx  torque (estimated)
 Race mode (power-saving): 
 FanBoost: Additional 
 Power-to-weight ratio: 0.30 hp/kg.
Maximum power will be available during practice and qualifying sessions. During races, power-saving mode will apply with the push-to-pass system temporarily allowing maximum power for a limited time.
The amount of energy that can be delivered to the Motor Generator Unit (MGU) by the Rechargeable Energy Storage System (RESS) is limited to 30 kWh. This will be monitored by the FIA.

Performance
Acceleration: 0–100 km/h (0–62 mph) in 3 s — Estimated
Maximum speed:  (FIA limited)
Final performance figures are still to be verified.

Motors
 MGU by McLaren
 Maximum of two MGUs allowed
 MGUs must be linked only to the rear axle
 The use of traction control is forbidden

Traction battery
 The traction battery is a 28 kWh Rechargeable Energy Storage System (RESS) and supplies electric energy to the Power Circuit and thus to the traction motor. Any onboard battery electrically connected to the Power Circuit is considered to be an integral part of the vehicle's traction battery

Rechargeable Energy Storage System
 A Rechargeable Energy Storage System (RESS) is a system that is designed to propel the car via the electric motor. In order to comply they must be:
 FIA Standard
 The maximum weight of the Battery Cells and/or Capacitor of the RESS must not be higher than 200 kg
 All Battery Cells must be certified to UN Transportation Standards as a minimum requirement

Chassis
The Dallara built car features:
 Chassis / Survival cell — Carbon/aluminium honeycomb structure
 Front and rear wing — Carbon structures and Aero styling
 Bodywork — Carbon — Kevlar honeycomb structures

Gearbox
 Hewland paddle-shift sequential gearbox
 Fixed gear ratios to reduce costs

Brakes
 Standard two separate Hydraulic systems, operated by the same pedal
 Brake material is a free choice
 Calipers; the section of each caliper piston must be circular
The body of the calipers must be made from aluminium alloy

Wheels and tyres
 Bespoke 18" treaded Michelin tyres for use on both wet and dry conditions/surfaces
 Championship specific wheel dimensions
 O.Z. Racing Magnesium wheels. Max width — front  / rear . Max Diameter — front  / rear

Electronics
 McLaren Electronics ECU/GCU including data logging system
 Power supply management unit
 CAN data acquisition pre-equipment
 FIA Marshalling system
 Beacon receiver
 Telemetry is not permitted

Suspension
 Double-steel wishbones, pushrod-operated, twin-dampers and torsion bars suspension (front) and spring suspension (rear)
 Adjustable ride height, camber and toe
 Two way (front) / Four-way (rear) adjustable Koni dampers
 Adjustable anti-roll bar (front/rear)

Steering system
 Non-assisted rack and pinion steering system (power assistance is allowed)
 Steering wheel with dashboard, marshaling display, gear change, and clutch paddles

Safety
 FIA safety standards including front, side, rear, and steering column impact tests
 Front and rear roll hoop, impact structures, and monocoque push tests
 Anti-intrusion survival cell protection panels
 Wheel-retainer safety cables
 Extinguisher system (electronically-operated)

Camera equipment
 Roll hoop, nose cone and face shot camera pre-equipment

In video games

The series commissioned established sim racing developer MAK-Corp to create the SRT_01E for their Hyperstimulator Simulators for use at promotional events for the series. MAK-Corp's car is not available for public use. The car also features in Turn 10 Studios' game Forza Motorsport 5, Studio 397's rFactor 2 and EA's Real Racing 3 mobile game.

References

External links

 Official website
 Spark Racing Technology website
 Formula E on the FIA website

Open wheel racing cars
SRT 01E
Electric sports cars
Formula E
Articles with underscores in the title